New Hampshire Route 129 (abbreviated NH 129) is an  secondary east–west state highway in New Hampshire. The road runs between Loudon and Gilmanton.

The southwestern terminus of NH 129 is in Loudon at South Village Road, west of the intersection with New Hampshire Route 106. The northeastern terminus is at New Hampshire Route 107 in Gilmanton.

Major intersections

References

External links 

 New Hampshire State Route 129 on Flickr

129
Transportation in Merrimack County, New Hampshire
Transportation in Belknap County, New Hampshire